Player's Guide may refer to:
 Strategy guide
 Nintendo Player's Guide

Tabletop role playing game sourcebooks
 Player's Guide to Eberron
 Player's Guide to Faerûn
 Player's Guide to the Dragonlance Campaign
 Player's Guide to the Forgotten Realms Campaign
 Forgotten Realms Player's Guide
 Greyhawk Player's Guide